Shangma may refer to these places in China:

Shangma Township, a township in Xiangyuan County, Shanxi

Subdistricts
Shangma Subdistrict, Houma, in Houma, Shanxi
Shangma Subdistrict, Qingdao, in Chengyang District, Qingdao, Shandong

Towns
Shangma, Liaoning, in Fushun County, Liaoning
Shangma, Sichuan, in Luzhou, Sichuan